SCDF may refer to:

Singapore Civil Defence Force, an emergency service in Singapore under the Ministry of Home Affairs
Sacred Congregation for the Doctrine of the Faith, a Congregation of the Roman Curia